Institute of Hotel Management Catering & Nutrition (IHM), Pusa, New Delhi, generally known as IHM Pusa, is the top hotel management institute in India  hospitality management school located in Delhi, India. IHM Pusa is situated in Pusa Institutional Area, New Delhi. IHM Pusa is known to be the top hotel management institute in the country for the last 10 years in a row because of its placements, faculty, discipline and students. The Institute is governed by the National Council for Hotel Management & Catering Technology set up by the Ministry of Tourism, Govt. of India.

History

This Institute is the second Government institute to start in 1962 under the Ministry of food after the Dadar Catering College, Bombay (Now IHM Mumbai). It was started by the Government Of India under the guidance of Sir Belfield Smith in Pusa, New Delhi in the abandoned barracks behind present employment exchange building.

Courses
 3 years Generic BSc HHA.
 2 years MSc HHA.
 2 years MSc D&FSM.
 1 year PGDAOM.
 1 year DFBS.
 1 year DBC.
 1 year CCFP.

Rankings & Awards

The Institute has been ranked as the number one Hotel Management institute in India by Ministry of Tourism, Government of India for the past few years. It is also ranked as the top hotel management institute by news agencies like Outlook and Hindustan Times. There has been a tough competition between IHM Mumbai  and IHM Pusa for the first place in the past but both are the best institutes of hotel management in India and are unique in their own ways.

Vegetarian Option
In 2016, three IHMCTANs - Ahmedabad, Bhopal and Jaipur - started giving a student the option to choose only vegetarian cooking. In 2018, the National Council for Hotel Management (NCHM) announced that all IHMs will provide a vegetarian option beginning academic year 2018. This decision to offer a vegetarian option by IHMCTANs may be the first amongst any of the hospitality training institutes of the world. IHMCTAN at Pusa had already been experimenting with vegan cooking through "vegan months" and sustainability practices such as rainwater harvesting.

Alumni 
 Sanjeev Kapoor
 Vivek Singh (chef)
 Rakesh Sethi (chef)
 Manjit Gill
 Madhulika Liddle

See also
Institute of Hotel Management

References

External links
 IHM Pusa

Universities and colleges in Delhi
Hospitality schools in India
Educational institutions established in 1962
Ministry of Tourism (India)
Institute of Hotel Management
1962 establishments in Delhi